Labor Hero is one of the highest titles of honor of North Korea and the highest decoration of the country overall. The award was probably scheduled for establishment in the summer of 1950, but the Korean War postponed these plans. When the war had entered a phase of stalemate along the 38th parallel, the government had time to officially launch the decoration, originally under the name Korea Hero of Labor. 16 people were decorated Labor Heroes during the war and more since then. The decoration is based on its Soviet equivalent, Hero of Socialist Labour.

Specifications
Hero of Labor is the highest title of honor of North Korea. It is also the highest decoration of the country overall. Immediately below it are the Order of Kim Il-sung and Kim Il-sung Prizes. Along with the title a gold medal is awarded. The medal features the hammer and sickle on a five-pointed star. It is awarded independently of the similar award of Order of Korean Labour.

History
Hero of Labor was probably scheduled to be established in the summer of 1950, but the breaking up of the Korean War halted the plans. Only when the war reached a stalemate along the 38th parallel did the government have time to concentrate on its awards system. Hero of Labor was promulgated on 17 July 1951 and it became the highest civilian award of the country. The title is based on its Soviet equivalent, Hero of Socialist Labour.

It was initially promulgated as Korea Hero of Labor, using the Korean word Choson. This set it apart from the related Order of Labor whose full name was "Korean People's Republic Order of Labor". This is likely because North Koreans copied every detail of the decorations of the Soviet Union, some of which featured the longer name of the country, "Soviet Union", and others simply "Soviet".

During the war, 16 people were decorated Labor Heroes. Once the war was over, surprisingly, Kim Il-sung was not awarded the title. He received one only on 7 September 1958, probably because he had consolidated his position in power following the 1956 attempted coup d'état known as the August Faction Incident. Kim Jong-il was never awarded one, leading observers to conclude that the prize did not have much political value at least at that time.

In more recent times, it has been habitually awarded to mothers who have given birth to exceptionally many children.

Recipients

See also

 Orders and medals of North Korea
 Hero of Socialist Labour
 Hero of Labor (Vietnam)
 Hero of Labour (GDR)

References

Works cited

Orders, decorations, and medals of North Korea
Hero (title)